Chinmayi (born 10 September 1984)  is an Indian playback singer, working mainly for the South Indian film industry.

List of Tamil songs

List of Telugu songs

2002

2003

2004

2005

2006

2007

2008

2009

2010

2011

2012

2013

2014

2015

2016

2017

2018

2019

2020

2021

2022

2023

List of Hindi songs

List of Malayalam songs

List of Kannada songs

List of other regional songs

Independent Music

Singles 
 Anbin Thooral
 Sneha Saandvanam
 Prema Chinukulu
 Laali (Debut as composer - Instagram #1MinMusic)

As Featuring Artist 

 Thiruda (Iraj Weeraratne) featuring Chinmayi, Psycho Mantra, Bullet Benjamin
 Butterfly (Shekhar Ravjiani) featuring Chinmayi
 Modhiram Mati Poga (Teejay) featuring Chinmayi
 Tholadivaaram (N. R. Raghunanthan) featuring Chinmayi
 Ulagam Maranthu (Jude Jeyaraj) featuring Chinmayi
 Yedho Oar Arayil (Gautham Vasudev Menon) featuring Chinmayi, Karthik
 Inaivom Indrae (Jerard Felix) featuring Chinmayi
 Spirit of Chennai 
 Nee Venakale Nadichi (Saurabh-Durgesh) with Chinmayi
 Mandhira Kannile (Saurabh-Durgesh) with Chinmayi
 Naino Ki Aarziyaan (Saurabh-Durgesh) with Chinmayi
 Vetrumai Pazhagu (Jerard Felix) with Chinmayi, Sunitha Sarathy, Benny Dayal, Rahul Nambiar and Sathya Prakash
 O Jaana (Nilesh Khandale) with Chinmayi and Shahid Mallya
 Yezhunthu Vaa (Shashaa Tirupati) with Chinmayi
 Venal Kaalam Etho Konil (Naveen Anandh) with Chinmayi
 Pesu (B. Babushankar) with Chinmayi, Benny Dayal, Sunitha Sarathy, Blaaze, Mugen Rao, Madhumitha Babushankar, Avaneesh Babushankar
 Kunguma Poove (Flute Navin) with Chinmayi
 Nithirai Nila (Mathews Pulickan) with Chinmayi and Anirudh Ravichander
 Raya (Sagar Janardhan) with Chinmayi
 Crazy 96 (Karthik Venkatesh) with Chinmayi and Santhosh Venky
 Mayakural Ondru Ketkuthey (Baiju Jacob) with Chinmayi and Pradeep Kumar

Videography 

 Semmozhiyaana Thamizh Mozhiyaam
 Thiruda (Iraj Weeraratne) featuring Chinmayi, Psycho Mantra, Bullet Benjamin
 Inaivom Indrae (Jerard Felix) featuring Chinmayi
 Kannulla Munde - Lyric Video from Sahasam Swasaga Sagipo by A. R. Rahman
 Mayya Mayya by Chinmayi
 Yezhunthu Vaa (Shashaa Tirupati) with Chinmayi
 Venal Kaalam Etho Konil (Naveen Anandh) with Chinmayi
 Pesu - Talk to Me (B. Babushankar) with Chinmayi, Benny Dayal, Sunitha Sarathy, Blaaze, Mugen Rao, Madhumitha Babushankar, Avaneesh Babushankar
 Kunguma Poove (Flute Navin) with Chinmayi

Jingles and Advertisements 
Chinmayi has sung in various jingles and also dubbed for several artistes in advertisements.

Some of the Jingles in which she has sung:
 The Chennai Silks (Vivaha Pattu) – Pattu Katti
 Maa Fruit Drink Advertisement – Anbukku
 Kalyan Jewellers – Humming
 Toyota Etios Theme Song – Pehli Baar
 Prince Jewellery Ad – Singara Nagaiyum (Tamil and Kannada) / Abharana Pravayam (Malayalam)
 Prince Jewellery – Idhu Enna Maayam (Tamil) / Idhu Maayajalam (Malayalam)
 Jayalakshmi Silks – Madhura Swapnanghal (New Version)
 7UP – Payanigalin
 Sri Devi Textiles
 Tata Gold Plus Ad
 Vajee Care
 Pepsi Ad
 Nalli Silks Ad
 Textile India Ad
 Spinz Talc Ad
 Nyle Ad
 Suryan FM Title song
 Ragamalika Title Song
 Vencobb Chicken Ad - Tamil/Telugu
 Saravana Stores
 Dheepam Oil
 Sunland Oil
 DooPaaDoo.com
 Sudha Hospitals – Aararo
 Sree kumaran Thanga Maligai
 GRB Ghee - Manal Manalaai Nei Irundhaal

Chinmayi has lent her voice for Samantha Ruth Prabhu in most of her AD Films in both Tamil and Telugu. She has also dubbed for Sneha in her series of AD Films for Super Saravana Stores and GRT Jewellers. Other works include dubbing for actress Anushka Shetty in the Head and Shoulders TVC, for Trisha in the Pothys (Samudrika Pattu) TVC, a series of ADs for Estancia, Sabena Citrus Plus, Sree Gold Dhall and for Jyotika in one of the Sakthi Masala ADs.

Title Songs for Television Serials 
Chinmayi has also sung title songs for various television serials. She first sang the title song of Anbulla Snehithiye, after she was introduced to the serial director by director Mani Ratnam. The list of serials she has sung for:

References 

Discographies of Indian artists